A small press is a publisher with annual sales below a certain level or below a certain number of titles published. The terms "indie publisher" and "independent press" and others are sometimes used interchangeably.

Independent press is generally defined as publishers that are not part of large conglomerates or multinational corporations. Many small presses rely on specialization in genre fiction, poetry, or limited-edition books or magazines, but there are also thousands that focus on niche non-fiction markets.

Definitions

In the United States, this has been mentioned as publishers with annual turnover of under $50 million, or those that publish on average 10 or fewer titles per year.

Other terms for small press, sometimes distinguished from each other and sometimes used interchangeably, are small publishers, independent publishers, or indie presses.

Independent publishers (as defined above) made up about half of the market share of the book publishing industry in the US in 2007. The majority of small presses are independent or indie publishers, meaning that they are separate from the handful of major publishing house conglomerates, such as Random House or Hachette.

Characteristics
Since the profit margins for small presses can be narrow, many are driven by other motives, including the desire to help disseminate literature with only a small likely market. Many presses are also associated with crowdfunding efforts that help connect authors with readers. Small presses tend to fill the niches that larger publishers neglect. They can focus on regional titles, narrow specializations and niche genres. They can also make up for commercial clout by creating a reputation for academic knowledge, vigorously pursuing prestigious literature prizes and spending more effort nurturing the careers of new authors.  At its most minimal, small press production consists of chapbooks. This role can now be taken on by desktop publishing and web sites. This still leaves a continuum of small press publishing: from specialist periodicals, short runs or print-to-order of low-demand books, to fine art books and limited editions of collectors' items printed to high standards.

Micro-presses
There is now also a distinction made between small presses and micro-presses. A micro-press can be defined as a publisher that produces chapbooks and other small books on a very small scale (e.g. 50 copies of one book per year). It can also be defined in terms of revenue. Micro-presses are often run as a hobby or part-time job because of their low profits. They may not produce enough profit to support their owners.

In Canada, these are considered small press publishers, but the standard small press book run is accepted at 300 copies of a chapbook and 500 or more copies of a spine-bound book. In doing this, small press publishers are eligible for grants from the Ontario Arts Council and the Canada Council.

Not to be confused with
Small presses should not be confused with self-publishing presses (sometimes called "vanity presses"). Self-publishing or subsidy presses usually require payment by authors, or a minimum purchase of copies. By comparison, small presses make their profits by selling books to consumers, rather than selling services to authors or selling a small number of copies to the author's friends.

Small presses should not be confused with printers. Small presses are publishers, which means that they engage in a book selection process, along with editing, marketing and distribution. Small presses also enter into a contract with the author, often paying royalties for being allowed to sell the book. Publishers own the copies they have printed, but usually do not own the copyright to the book itself. In contrast, printers merely print a book, and sometimes offer limited distribution if they are a POD printing press. Printers have a very low selectivity. They will accept nearly anyone who can pay the cost of printing. They rarely offer editing or marketing. Printers do not own the copies that are printed, and they do not pay royalties.

Book packagers combine aspects of small presses and printers, but they are technically neither small presses nor printers.

History
Small presses became distinguishable from jobbing printers at some time towards the end of the nineteenth century. The roots lie with the Arts and Crafts movement, particularly the Kelmscott Press. The use of small letterpress machines by amateur printers increased proportionately to the mechanization of commercial printing. Later, the advance of practical lithography made small press publication much easier.

A recent burgeoning of small presses has been caused by the introduction of digital printing, especially print on demand technology. Combined with Internet based marketing, digital typesetting, design tools with the rise of eBooks, the new printing technologies have lowered the economic barriers to entry, allowing many new niches to be served, and many new publishers to enter the industry.

By country

Australia

Small presses have played a significant part historically in recognising new voices and publishing notable works of literary fiction in Australia, but the market was seen as a tough one in 1999, despite about 80 per cent of the Australian Publishers Association being small book publishers (defined as those with less than AU$2m), nearly all Australian-owned.

In recent years, though, the small publishers have especially made gains as big publishers have backed away from publishing literary works. Small press publications have won some of the greatest literary prizes, including the Stella Prize, the Prime Minister's Literary Award for Fiction and the Miles Franklin Literary Award. There was a strong upward trend in the number of titles published by small press and shortlisted for the Miles Franklin and the PM's Fiction Awards in the two years preceding 2017.

The Small Press Network (SPN), located at the Wheeler Centre in Melbourne, represents small and independent publishers in Australia, which promotes independent publishing and supports diversity within the industry "as a vital component of Australian literary culture". Founded in 2006, it has grown to represent more than 140 members in Australia and New Zealand. Its members include such publishers as the Griffith Review, National Library of Australia Publishing, Scribe and Wakefield Press, as well as many smaller publishers.

See also

 Amateur press association
 Association of Little Presses
 Author mill
 Bill Bird
 Independent Publishers Guild (UK)
 Independent Publishers Group (US distributors)
 List of English-language book publishing companies
 List of English-language literary presses
 List of English-language small presses
 List of literary magazines
 List of self-publishing companies
 Literary magazine
 Predatory open-access publishing
 Private press
 Samizdat
 Small Press Distribution
 WSFA Small Press Award

References

Sources

External links 

 Small Press collections held at University College London.

 
Small Press